Huang Chung is the self-titled debut studio album by English new wave band Huang Chung (later known as Wang Chung).  Huang Chung was released on 4 March 1982 on both vinyl and cassette. Included on the album cover is the name of the band in Chinese (literally Yellow Bell) meaning the first note in the Chinese classical music scale. On 19 September 1995, One Way Records re-released the album on CD under license from Arista Records.  The album has since been discontinued.

Huang Chung was supposed to be one of two studio albums that the band recorded for Arista Records, but they departed and signed a recording contract with Geffen Records afterwards because their manager spotted the band's potential and their upcoming song, "Dance Hall Days", to be a possibly big hit. Meanwhile, after the release, Huang Chung saxophonist David Burnand (a.k.a. Hogg Robinson) left due to "musical differences".  No song hit any charts in the US or the UK.

A mastering error is present on the 1995 CD reissue. The track break between "I Never Want to Love You in a Half-Hearted Way" and "Ti Na Na" occurs a fraction of a second before the former track ends. Thus, track 3 begins with what sounds like a glitch, though it is actually the very end of track 2.

Track listing
All songs were written and composed by Jack Hues, except as noted below. Nick Feldman was credited as Nick DeSpig throughout this album.

Arista UK LP: SPART 1174

Arista US LP: AL 6603

1995 – One Way Records CD: OW 31444

Credits
Producers:
 Tracks 1, 2, 4, 5, 10 – Produced by Rhett Davies;
 Tracks 6, 8, 9 – Produced by Roger Bechirian;
 Tracks 3 & 7 – Produced by Rhett Davies and remixed by Roger Bechirian

Recorded at The Gallery, Basing St; and Jam Studios
 Engineers at Basing St: Nigel Mills, Stuart Henderson
 Engineer at Jam: Dave Bellotti
 Assistance: David Massey, Vikki Pepys, Sarah Lubel
 Photos by Fin Costello
 Design: Steve Joule
 Logo Design by Alex Feldman (sister of bass guitarist Nick Feldman)
 Management by Ged Doherty and Andy Hilton

References

External links

Wang Chung (band) albums
1982 debut albums
Albums produced by Rhett Davies
Albums produced by Roger Bechirian
Arista Records albums